Bartram's Covered Bridge, a historic covered bridge built in 1860, uses a Burr Truss design and carried Goshen Road over Crum Creek on the border between Delaware County and Chester County, Pennsylvania. The bridge has slanted planks at each entrance and is the only covered bridge in Pennsylvania with this feature. According to an on-site marker from the Newtown Square Historical Preservation Society, the bridge was built to be "hi and wide as a load of hay" It was built by Ferdinand Wood and named for Mordecai Bartram.

It was closed to traffic in 1941 and stands next to a new bridge on Goshen Road.  The east end of the bridge is located in Newtown Township, Delaware County and the west end in  Willistown Township, Chester County.

It was listed on the National Register of Historic Places in 1980.

See also

List of covered bridges on the National Register of Historic Places in Pennsylvania

References

Sources

Covered bridges on the National Register of Historic Places in Pennsylvania
Bridges completed in 1860
Covered bridges in Chester County, Pennsylvania
Bridges in Delaware County, Pennsylvania
Pedestrian bridges in Pennsylvania
Former road bridges in the United States
National Register of Historic Places in Chester County, Pennsylvania
National Register of Historic Places in Delaware County, Pennsylvania
Road bridges on the National Register of Historic Places in Pennsylvania
Wooden bridges in Pennsylvania
Burr Truss bridges in the United States